The Smith & Wesson Model 686 is a six- or seven-shot double-action revolver manufactured by Smith & Wesson and chambered for the .357 Magnum cartridge; it will also chamber and fire .38 Special cartridges. Smith & Wesson introduced the Model 686 in 1981. It is the stainless steel version of the Model 586, which featured a blued steel finish. They are available ported and unported with a choice of 6- or 7-round cylinders.

The Model 686 is based on S&W's L (medium) revolver frame.  During the 1980s, Smith & Wesson developed its L-Frame line of .357 Magnums: the Model 581, Model 586, Model 681 and Model 686. The Models 581 and 681 have fixed sights, whereas the 586 and 686 use adjustable sights.

Variants of the 686
The 686 has been available with 2.5,3,4,5,6,7 and 8 in barrel lengths as standard models and other barrel lengths either by special order from S&W's Performance Center custom shop, or acquired from or built by after-market gunsmiths. The Performance Center made a limited number of Model 686s chambered for .38 Super cartridges for competitive shooters.

The 686 features a 6-round cylinder. The 686P variant, marketed as the Model 686 Plus, has a 7-round cylinder. The 686PP variant, with PP designating PowerPort, has an integral compensator (also known as a muzzle brake).

The 686 has been made with pistol grips having a squared or rounded end (colloquially, "square butt" or "round butt"). The grips on the pistol can be changed, and multiple after-market options are available.

The Model 686 has an adjustable rear sight, and until 1992, the  versions had the option of an adjustable front sight. They had Goncalo alves hardwood grips until 1994, when the grip was replaced by a rubber Hogue grip.

Through the years, there have been several variations on the Model 686. The Model 686 Classic Hunter was introduced in 1988 and has a  barrel and a non-fluted cylinder; the Model 686 Black Stainless was introduced in 1989 and has either a  barrel with a black finish, with production limited to 5000; the Model 686 National Security Special was introduced in 1992 and has a  barrel; the Model 686 Target Champion was introduced in 1992 and has a  match-grade barrel, adjustable trigger stop, and walnut grips; the Model 686 Power Port was introduced in 1994 and has a ported  barrel; the Model 686 Plus was introduced in 1996 and has a  barrel, adjustable sights, 7-shot cylinder, and Hogue rubber grips. As with all current Smith & Wesson revolvers, the 686 Plus now has a key lock integral to the frame of the gun.

Engineering and production changes

686 (no dash), 1981 Introduction model
686-1, 1986 radius stud package, floating hand
686-2, 1987 changed hammer nose, bushing and associated parts
686-3, 1988 new yoke retention system
686-4, 1993 change rear sight leaf, drill and tap frame, change extractor, Hogue grips
686-5, 1997 change frame design to eliminate cylinder stop stud, eliminate serrated tangs, MIM hammer and trigger, change internal lock.
686-6, 2001 internal lock
686-7, 2003 Performance Center .38 Super, 6-Shot unfluted cylinder, 4" barrel, Stainless Steel, 250 Made

Gallery

Users
  – Used by GIGN during amphibious operations.
  – The 3"-barreled version with Goncalo alves hardwood-grip was used as a sidearm in the alien immigrant-branches of the Norwegian Police Service by individual plainclothes officers during the early 1990s.
  – Used by U.S. Border Patrol. Used by legacy U.S. Customs Service. Used by the legacy U.S. Immigration and Naturalization Service  Used by U.S. Navy SEALs during waterborne missions. Used by some smaller police departments and by individual officers in larger departments, especially in marine environments.
  – Used by the Luxembourg Grand Ducal Police as duty weapon from the 1980s through 2017 when it was replaced by the HK VP9.

Recall
In 1987, seven years after the release of the Model 686, there were reports of cylinder binding with some types of standard .357 Magnum ammunition for L-frame revolvers manufactured before August 1987. S&W put out a product warning and authorized a no-charge upgrade to make modifications to the revolver. All recalled and reworked guns were stamped with an M marking, signifying that they had been recalled and fixed; thus it is known as the M modification for all 686, 686-1, 586-1, and 586-2 revolvers.

References

External links
Smith & Wesson Inc.

.357 Magnum firearms
.38 Special firearms
Smith & Wesson revolvers
Revolvers of the United States
Police weapons
Weapons and ammunition introduced in 1980